Bulbinella rossii, commonly known as the Ross lily, is a species of flowering plant in genus Bulbinella. It is one of the subantarctic megaherbs. The specific epithet honours British Antarctic explorer James Clark Ross, who visited Campbell Island in December 1840.

Description
Bulbinella rossii is a large, dioecious, perennial lily, growing up to 1 m in height and with a basal diameter of 40 mm. The dark green, fleshy, strap-like leaves are 0.6–1 m long and 15–60 mm wide. The inflorescence is a cylindrical raceme up to 600 mm long.  The golden yellow flowers are densely crowded, 10–14 mm in diameter, and are often flushed with orange.  The ovoid seed capsule is 10 mm long, containing narrowly winged, dark brown seeds. The plant flowers from October to January and fruits from December to March.

Distribution and habitat
The lily is endemic to New Zealand’s subantarctic Auckland and Campbell Islands. There it is common and widespread from sea level to the tops of the island mountains. Because it thrives where the ground has been disturbed, and because it is not particularly palatable to browsing animals, it is common near old human habitation sites and may form dense colonies in open herbfield and tussock grassland.

Conservation Status 
The species is listed as "At Risk - Naturally Uncommon" in the most recent (2018) assessment using New Zealand Threatened Classification for plants, because of its restricted range.

References

Notes

Sources

rossii
Flora of the Auckland Islands
Flora of the Campbell Islands
Dioecious plants